WVOL (1470 AM) is a radio station  broadcasting an urban oldies format. Licensed to the Nashville suburb of Berry Hill, Tennessee, United States, the station serves the Nashville area.  The station is currently owned by Heidelberg Broadcasting, LLC.  The station and transmitter are co-located just north of downtown Nashville in the Cumberland Heights district.

History

The station was founded in 1951 as WSOK. The station was located on 4th Avenue N. in Downtown Nashville. WSOK originally was licensed as a daytime only station with 1,000 watts. WSOK was owned by Cal Young. In 1953, WSOK obtained a sister FM station on 105.9, and was WSOK-FM, which today is Nashville's WNRQ (owned by iHeart Media). WSOK's original format was rhythm and blues and urban gospel music. WSOK was the first station in the Nashville market to program primarily to the city's African-American community. Robert W. Rounsaville bought the station from Cal Young around 1957, the call letters were changed to WVOL, but the station continued its focus on the local African-American community. Roundsaville built WVOL a new studio and transmitter facility just north of the Downtown Nashville area, which included a daytime power increase to 5,000 watts with a two-tower directional pattern, and also adding nighttime service with 1,000 watts using a six tower directional pattern at the new facility. The new facility was put into operation around 1960. This facility is still in operation today.

In 1980, The Phoenix Communication Group, (Samuel H. Howard) acquired WVOL. In May of 1982, Phoenix would acquire a sister FM for WVOL, that was WMAK-FM. In 1984 WMAK-FM would go back to the moniker name that made it famous "92Q" and call sign changed to WQQK. Around this time, 92Q, WQQK's studios was moved into the same building with WVOL just north of Downtown Nashville. In the spring of 1988, WVOL dropped live programming and affiliated with Satellite Music Network. The network, impressed with the station, launched a format based on WVOL's sound. WVOL aired satellite-fed programming until 1993. Around that time, the station was sold to Dickey Brothers Broadcasting.

In a transaction that closed in April 2000, WVOL was purchased by John Heidelberg, an African-American entrepreneur who was a former employee of both WVOL and WSM, from Dickey Brothers Broadcasting in exchange for cash and an FM construction permit that would later become WRQQ (now WLVU). WVOL's format was urban gospel during the day, and jazz overnight. In 1970, when Heidelberg was acting program director of WVOL, he was the first person to employ Oprah Winfrey, then a local high school student, as a broadcaster. Eventually becoming a news anchor on WVOL, Winfrey later launched her TV career as an anchor with WLAC-TV in Nashville, before becoming an iconic national talk show host.

WVOL switched to its current format of urban adult contemporary, urban oldies and talk shows in March 2001.

In March 2011, WVOL suffered $1 million in damage when vandals cut the transmission lines to all six of the station's towers.

References

External links

The History Makers - John Heidelberg

VOL
VOL
Urban oldies radio stations in the United States